Poppy is a nickname. It may refer to:

 family nickname of U.S. President George H. W. Bush (1924–2018), popularized by New York Times columnist Maureen Dowd
 early nickname of Lucy, Lady Houston (1857–1936), British philanthropist, political activist, suffragette, and eccentric
 Katharine Poppy Harlow (born 1982), American news anchor and reporter
 Frances Northcutt (born 1943), American attorney and first female engineer to work in NASA's Mission Control
 Moriah Rose Pereira (born 1995), American singer, songwriter, and YouTube personality known as Poppy 
 Paul Puopolo (born 1987), Australian rules footballer
 Sadika Parvin Popy, Bangladeshi actress

Lists of people by nickname